Langley Abbey was an abbey of Premonstratensian Canons in Langley Green, now in the civil parish of Langley with Hardley, Norfolk, England. The monastery was founded by Robert fitzRoger in 1195.

There are remains of the church and barn as well as earthworks of other buildings and fish ponds. The site was partially restored and opened to the public as a museum in 2010.

It is a Grade I listed building.

Citations

External links
 Langley Abbey Website

Monasteries in Norfolk
Grade I listed buildings in Norfolk